Benton is an unincorporated community in Texas Township, Crawford County, Ohio, United States.

History
Benton was laid out in 1841, and named for Thomas Hart Benton, a U.S. Senator from Missouri.

References

Unincorporated communities in Crawford County, Ohio
Unincorporated communities in Ohio